Larry Heiniemi (born March 14, 1939) is an American retired professional wrestler, better known by his ring name, Lars Anderson. His career spans over a decade of performing in National Wrestling Alliance (NWA) territories as well as the American Wrestling Association (AWA).

Professional wrestling career
Heiniemi started wrestling in 1965. He formed a tag team with his "brother" Gene Anderson and also tagged with his other "brother" Ole Anderson. Anderson was only the real last name for Gene Anderson . Ole and Lars had changed their names to pretend to be the real life brothers of Gene. He occasionally wrestled with them as the Minnesota Wrecking Crew. Lars did not have the success that the other Andersons had. He did win numerous NWA regional championships, including winning the Georgia version of the NWA World Tag Team Championship with Gene Anderson. Lars wrestled briefly in the Carolinas as "Luscious" Lars Anderson.

In the early 1970s, he wrestled in the San Francisco bay area (again as Luscious Lars Anderson), winning the NWA (San Francisco) World Tag Team title with partner Paul DeMarco in 1972.

On the microphone, Larry was one of the best talkers in an era when getting over on the microphone was important. In the early '70s, after leaving Gene Anderson, he returned to the AWA and hooked up with Larry "Pretty Boy" Hennig. The latter needed a new partner after the departure of "Handsome" Harley Race who ventured to the NWA.

In the mid 1970s, Heiniemi was joined by his college friend, Les "Budd" Wolfe. Together they formed a solid combination, and many felt they should have won the AWA World Tag Team titles. In March 1975, Heiniemi announced he was retiring from the ring, and after losing his last match to England's Billy Robinson, Larry left the AWA. 

However in 1977, he was back to using the Lars Anderson handle and briefly feuded with his "brothers" Gene and Ole in Atlanta in 1977.

He spent the last years of his career wrestling in Hawaii for Polynesian Pacific Wrestling (PPW). When its owner, Peter Maivia, died in 1982, his wife hired Heiniemi as head booker. This lasted until 1988 when the dwindling promotion folded. Dwayne Johnson, former wrestler and grandson of Peter Maivia, spoke of Heiniemi in his 2000 autobiography, The Rock Says.... Johnson described a scene where, as a teenager, he angrily confronted Heiniemi when he refused to drop the Polynesian Pacific Heavyweight title to Allen Coage, who was wrestling as Bad News Allen at the time.

In 1996, Heiniemi established World League Wrestling. This little known promotion consisted largely of wrestlers from his training school and former PPW talent. The promotion officially folded in 2000.

Championships and accomplishments
American Wrestling Association
AWA Midwest Tag Team Championship (1 time) - with Larry Hennig
AWA Midwest Heavyweight Championship (2 times)
American Wrestling Federation
AWF Heavyweight Championship (1 time)
Championship Wrestling from Florida
NWA Florida Heavyweight Championship (2 times)
NWA Florida Southern Tag Team Championship (2 times) - with Gene Anderson
Georgia Championship Wrestling
NWA Georgia Tag Team Championship (2 times) - with Ole Anderson
NWA World Tag Team Championship (Georgia Version) (1 time) - with Gene Anderson
National Wrestling Alliance
NWA Hall of Fame (class of 2010)
NWA Polynesian Wrestling
NWA Polynesian Pacific Heavyweight Championship (5 times)
NWA Polynesian Pacific Tag Team Championship (1 time) - with Seiji Sakaguchi
NWA San Francisco
NWA World Tag Team Championship (San Francisco Version) (1 time) - with Paul DeMarco
World Championship Wrestling
IWA World Tag Team Championship (1 time) - with Dick Murdoch

References

External links 
 
 

1939 births
American male professional wrestlers
American people of Finnish descent
Anderson family
Living people
People from Bovey, Minnesota
Professional wrestlers from Minnesota
Professional wrestling promoters
St. Cloud State University alumni
20th-century professional wrestlers
NWA Florida Heavyweight Champions
IWA World Tag Team Champions (Australia)
NWA Georgia Tag Team Champions